Twin Buttes is a populated place situated in Navajo County, Arizona, United States. It is one of two populated locations in Arizona with this name, the other being in Pima County.

References

Populated places in Navajo County, Arizona